"Change" is a song recorded by American singer Christina Aguilera. It was written by Aguilera, Fancy Hagood and Flo Reutter, while its production was done by Flo Reutter and Martin Terefe. RCA Records premiered the song on June 16, 2016, on On Air with Ryan Seacrest. The song was dedicated to the victims of the Orlando nightclub shooting. The proceedings are donated to the National Compassion Fund to benefit the victims' families.

Lyrically, the song talks about self-identity and acceptance. Characterized as a slow ballad, received mostly positive reviews from music critics, who praised Aguilera's vocals and the song's empowering lyrics.

Background and composition

The song was recorded for her forthcoming record but was repurposed and mastered in light of recent events, premiered on Apple Music, is Aguilera's way of honoring the victims lost in the Orlando tragedy and promoting peace. Aguilera writes in a message posted on her website:

The horrific tragedy that occurred in Orlando continues to weigh heavily on my mind. I am sending so much love and so many prayers to the victims and their families. Like so many, I want to help be part of the change this world needs to make it a beautiful inclusive place where humanity can love each other freely and passionately.

Co-writer Who Is Fancy revealed that he started writing the song in 2015 after a police officer shot and killed 18-year-old Mansur Ball-Bey in St. Louis. "I was just having a lot of conversation about race and minorities and how something needed to be done". "It just felt like so much injustice. At that time, the bill allowing gay marriage had also not passed. So the song was just a reflection on what was needed by so many — change."

"Change" is a gospel ballad. The song is written in the key of G major with a tempo of 82 beats per minute.  The song alternates between  time and  time while the song follows a chord progression of G/B – C – G, and Aguilera's vocals span from E3 to D5.

In January 2015, it was reported that "Change" was intended for Aguilera's then-upcoming, eight studio album, supposedly called Blonde. It was listed among nineteen other titles from the alleged, leaked tracklist. "Change" was then released in Spring 2016 and omitted from 2018's Liberation.

Critical reception
"Change" received an average rating of 7.75/10 from music blog Idolator based on four editors' reviews. Robbie Daw wrote that the song is "a lovely anthem about tolerance that never teeters toward the overly dramatic," though the reviewers did find the song somewhat "undercooked" compared to some of Aguilera's previous ballads such as 2002's "Beautiful". Lucas Villa of AXS wrote, "[The song] is a little soulful tune with a heartfelt message capable of reaching the heavens in Xtina's hands." Spin'''s Brennan Carley praised the song, saying that it reminds listeners "just how vocally walloping Aguilera can be when she sings even the simplest of notes". Fuse complimented the song's "empowering message", and Sophie Atkinson of Bustle called it "haunting", as well as a "genuinely moving and beautiful piece of music".

Elton John praised the song, calling it "beautiful" and "very moving" during his Rocket Hour radio show. Samuel Granger of The Odyssey called "Change" one of his favorite songs of 2016, Luvpop listed it as one of the year's best songs, and Billboard's Muri Assunção believed it has an empowering value. Assunção also considered "Change" an LGBTQ anthem.

Chart performance
In the United States, "Change" debuted at number 5 on the Billboard Bubbling Under Hot 100 chart. On the Digital Songs chart, it peaked at number 32, selling 27,063 copies during the week of its debut. The single also peaked at number 17 on the Pop Digital Songs. On the Canada AC, it peaked at number 36. It also peaked at number 40 on the Hot Canadian Digital Songs. Throughout Europe, it reached number 28 in Spain, number 47 in Scotland, number 78 in Croatia, number 121 in France, and number 173 in United Kingdom.

Music video

A lyric video premiered on Vevo and later on YouTube on June 16, 2016. In the video, lyrics of the song on a background of home movie, alternating childhood photographs of Aguilera with scenes that appear with red hair and chanting the subject.

 Performances 
The song was performed for the first time at the Jimmy Kimmel Live!'' on June 23, 2016. On July 31, 2016, Aguilera performed the song at the Black Sea Arena in Georgia. In September 2020, Aguilera posted a video on Twitter, in which she gives a rendition of the song. The reason was the #YourVoiceYourVote campaign which encouraged social media users to participate in the 2020 presidential elections.

Credits and personnel
Credits adapted from Tidal.

Manny Marroquin — mixing engineer
Florian Reutter – songwriter, producer
Dave Kutch — mastering engineer
Martin Terefe – producer
Jake Hagood – songwriter
Christina Aguilera —  lead vocals, songwriter

Track listings and formats
Digital download
"Change" – 3:07

Charts

Release history

References

External links

2016 singles
2016 songs
2010s ballads
Charity singles
Christina Aguilera songs
LGBT-related songs
Orlando nightclub shooting
Pop ballads
RCA Records singles
Songs written by Christina Aguilera
Songs written by Who Is Fancy
Gospel songs